The Earl of Essex is a Grade II listed public house at 616 Romford Road, Manor Park, London.

It was built in 1902 by the architects Henry Poston and William Edward Trent.

The pub has been closed since 2012, and as of April 2016, it is hoped to reopen in the near future.

References

Grade II listed buildings in the London Borough of Newham
Grade II listed pubs in London
Pubs in the London Borough of Newham
Manor Park, London
Stratford, London